Poul Schiang (23 May 1904 – 25 May 1981) was a Danish sprinter. He competed in the men's 100 metres and the 4 × 100 metres relay events at the 1924 Summer Olympics.

References

External links
 

1904 births
1981 deaths
Athletes (track and field) at the 1924 Summer Olympics
Danish male sprinters
Olympic athletes of Denmark
Athletes from Copenhagen